Fantacollana was a series of fantasy books published in Italy by Editrice Nord. The first number, issued in May 1973, featured The Jewels of Aptor by Samuel R. Delany. The first issues, edited by Riccardo Valla, featured covers by artists such as Karel Thole, Michael Whelan and Frank Frazetta. Valla was replaced in the mid-1970s by Sandro Pergameno, who was followed by Alex Voglino.

Authors translated included US fantasy writers such as L. Sprague de Camp, Fritz Leiber, Robert E. Howard, Jack Vance, C. J. Cherryh, Marion Zimmer Bradley, David Gemmell, Harry Turtledove, Stephen R. Lawhead,  and others. Original books from Italian authors were also published.

The series reduced substantially frequency of publication in the 2000s, including mostly short story collections edited by Marion Zimmer Bradley, and in 2006 and 2007 only two issues were published per year. The last issue was a translation of Marion Zimmer Bradley's Four Moons of Darkover, published in November 2008.

List 
1 - I gioielli di Aptor, Samuel Delany, 1973 (novel) 
2 - L'anello del tritone, L. Sprague De Camp, 1973 (novel) 
3 - Ali della notte, Robert Silverberg, 1973 (short story collection) 
4 - Lord Darcy, Randall Garrett, 1974 (short story collection) 
5 - Conan l'avventuriero, Robert E. Howard, 1974 (short story collection) 
6 - Jorian di Jiraz, L. Sprague De Camp, 1974 (novel) 
7 - Il pozzo della luna, Abraham Merritt, 1974 (short story collection) 
8 - Signore della luce, Roger Zelazny, 1975 (short story collection) 
9 - Kull di Valusia, Robert E. Howard, Lin Carter, 1975 (short story collection) 
10 - Paese d'ottobre, Ray Bradbury, 1975 (anthology) 
11 - Il castello d'acciaio, L. Sprague De Camp, Fletcher Pratt, 1975 (omnibus of novels) 
12 - Le spade di Lankhmar, Fritz Leiber, 1976 (novel) 
13 - Conan!, Robert E. Howard, Lin Carter, L. Sprague de Camp, 1976 (short story collection) 
14 - Alastor 2262, Jack Vance, 1976 (novel) 
15 - Il viaggio di Hiero, Sterling E. Lanier, 1976 (novel) 
16 - La stanza chiusa, Randall Garrett, 1977 (novel) 
17 - Zothique, Clark Ashton Smith, 1977 (anthology) 
18 - Davy, l'eretico, Edgar Pangborn, 1977 (novel) 
19 - Conan l'usurpatore, Robert E. Howard, 1977 (short story collection) 
20 - Il mondo di Nehwon, Fritz Leiber, 1977 (short story collection) 
21 - L'erede di Hastur, Marion Zimmer Bradley, 1978 (novel) 
22 - La porta di Ivrel, C. J. Cherryh, 1978 (novel) 
23 - Skull-Face, Robert E. Howard, 1978 (anthology) 
24 - Conan di Cimmeria, Robert E. Howard, Lin Carter, L. Sprague de Camp, 1978 (short story collection) 
25 - Elric di Melniboné, Michael Moorcock, 1978 (anthology) 
26 - Conan il Pirata, Robert E. Howard, 1979 (short story collection) 
27 - Il mago di Earthsea, Ursula K. Le Guin, 1979 (novel) 
28 - Spade tra i ghiacci, Fritz Leiber, 1979 (short story collection) 
29 - Tre cuori e tre leoni, Poul Anderson, 1979 (novel) 
30 - Elric il Negromante, Michael Moorcock, 1979 (short story collection) 
31 - Conan lo zingaro, Robert E. Howard, L. Sprague de Camp, Lin Carter, 1980 (short story collection) 
32 - Le tombe di Atuan, Ursula K. Le Guin, 1980 (novel) 
33 - Nostra Signora delle Tenebre, Fritz Leiber, 1980 (novel) 
34 - La torre proibita, Marion Zimmer Bradley, 1980 (novel) 
35 - Il drago e il George, Gordon R. Dickson, 1980 (novel) 
36 - Conan il guerriero, Robert E. Howard, L. Sprague de Camp, 1981 (short story collection) 
37 - La spiaggia più lontana, Ursula K. Le Guin, 1981 (novel) 
38 - La catena spezzata, Marion Zimmer Bradley, 1981 (novel) 
39 - Il pozzo di Shiuan, C. J. Cherryh, 1981 (novel) 
40 - L'era Hyboriana di Conan il Cimmero, Robert E. Howard, L. Sprague de Camp, Lin Carter, Björn Nyberg, 1981 (omnibus of novels) 
41 - Conan il bucaniere, L. Sprague De Camp, Lin Carter, 1982 (novel) 
42 - Jirel di Joiry, C. L. Moore, 1982 (short story collection) 
43 - Almuric. Il pianeta selvaggio, Robert E. Howard, 1982 (novel) 
44 - Northwest Smith il terrestre, C. L. Moore, 1982 (short story collection) 
45 - Il castello di Lord Valentine, Robert Silverberg, 1982 (novel) 
46 - Balthis l'avventuriera, Gianluigi Zuddas, 1983 (novel) 
47 - I figli del Tritone, Poul Anderson, 1983 (novel) 
48 - L'ombra del Torturatore, Gene Wolfe, 1983 (novel) 
49 - Cronache di Majipoor, Robert Silverberg, 1983 (short story collection) 
50 - L'esilio di Sharra, Marion Zimmer Bradley, 1983 (novel) 
51 - L'artiglio del conciliatore, Gene Wolfe, 1983 (novel) 
52 - Il mastino della guerra, Michael Moorcock, 1984 (novel) 
53 - La spada del Littore, Gene Wolfe, 1984 (novel) 
54 - Il ritorno di Hiero, Sterling E. Lanier, 1984 (novel) 
55 - La cittadella dell'Autarca, Gene Wolfe, 1984 (novel) 
56 - Il re non decapitato, L. Sprague De Camp, 1984 (novel) 
57 - Il Pontifex Valentine, Robert Silverberg, 1984 (novel) 
58 - Il volo dell'angelo, Gianluigi Zuddas, 1985 (novel) 
59 - Lyonesse, Jack Vance, 1985 (novel) 
60 - I fuochi di Azeroth, C. J. Cherryh, 1985 (novel) 
61 - Stregone suo malgrado, Christopher Stasheff, 1985 (novel) 
62 - Nel segno della Luna Bianca, Lino Aldani, Daniela Piegai, 1985 (novel) 
63 - Naufragio sul pianeta Darkover, Marion Zimmer Bradley, 1985 (novel) 
64 - La saga di Prydain, Lloyd Alexander, 1986 (omnibus of novels) 
65 - La grigia criniera del mattino, Joy Chant, 1986 (novel) 
66 - Il Re Pescatore, Tim Powers, 1986 (novel) 
67 - Il segno della profezia, David Eddings, 1986 (novel) 
68 - La perla verde, Jack Vance, 1986 (novel) 
69 - Il signore degli enigmi, Patricia A. Mc Killip, 1986 (omnibus of novels) 
70 - Damiano, Roberta Macavoy, 1987 (novel) 
71 - La spada incantata, Marion Zimmer Bradley, 1987 (novel) 
72 - La regina della magia, David Eddings, 1987 (novel) 
73 - Il principe rapito, Paul Edwin Zimmer, 1987 (novel) 
74 - Un mondo chiamato Camelot, Arthur H. Landis, 1987 (novel) 
75 - Il mago di Sua Maestà, Christopher Stasheff, 1987 (novel) 
76 - La valle di Aldur, David Eddings, 1987 (novel) 
77 - L'ascesa dei Deryni, Katherine Kurtz, 1988 (novel) 
78 - Un araldo per Valdemar, Mercedes Lackey, 1988 (novel) 
79 - Il castello incantato, David Eddings, 1988 (novel) 
80 - Il ritorno del principe, Paul Edwin Zimmer, 1988 (novel) 
81 - La congiura di Mandrigyn, Barbara Hambly, 1988 (novel) 
82 - La fine del gioco, David Eddings, 1988 (novel) 
83 - Le spade dei Drenai, David Gemmell, 1988 (novel) 
84 - La sfida dei Deryni, Katherine Kurtz, 1989 (novel) 
85 - La legione perduta, Harry Turtledove, 1989 (novel) 
86 - La leggenda dei Drenai, David Gemmell, 1989 (novel) 
87 - La principessa di Englene, Kathleen Sky, 1989 (novel) 
88 - Un imperatore per la legione, Harry Turtledove, 1989 (novel) 
89 - Il signore dei Deryni, Katherine Kurtz, 1989 (novel) 
90 - Taran di Prydain, Lloyd Alexander, 1989 (omnibus of novels) 
91 - La legione di Videssos, Harry Turtledove, 1990 (novel) 
92 - Il trono di Ark, Jonathan Wylie, 1990 (novel) 
93 - Le frecce di Valdemar, Mercedes Lackey, 1990 (novel) 
94 - Le daghe della Legione, Harry Turtledove, 1990 (novel) 
95 - Le montagne incantate, Ru Emerson, 1990 (novel) 
96 - Il cavaliere e il fante di spade, Fritz Leiber, 1990 (short story collection) 
97 - Un lupo nell'ombra, David Gemmell, 1990 (novel) 
98 - La lama dei druidi, Katharine Kerr, 1990 (novel) 
99 - Il ritorno del Re Drago, Stephen Lawhead, 1991 (novel) 
100 - Gli eredi di Ark, Jonathan Wylie, 1991 (novel) 
101 - Waylander, dei Drenai, David Gemmell, 1991 (novel) 
102 - Le caverne dell'esilio, Ru Emerson, 1991 (novel) 
103 - Lyonesse: Madouc, Jack Vance, 1991 (novel) 
104 - I Signori della Guerra di Nin, Stephen Lawhead, 1991 (novel) 
105 - L'ultimo dei guardiani, David Gemmell, 1991 (novel) 
106 - La strada per Underfall, Mike Jefferies, 1991 (novel) 
107 - Il destino di Valdemar, Mercedes Lackey, 1992 (novel) 
108 - L'ultimo eroe dei Drenai, David Gemmell, 1992 (novel) 
109 - Il mago di Ark, Jonathan Wylie, 1992 (novel) 
110 - La spada di fuoco, Stephen Lawhead, 1992 (novel) 
111 - L'incantesimo dei druidi, Katharine Kerr, 1992 (novel) 
112 - Sui mari del fato, Ru Emerson, 1992 (novel) 
113 - Il palazzo dei re, Mike Jefferies, 1992 (novel) 
114 - L'ascesa di Krispos, Harry Turtledove, 1992 (novel) 
115 - La magia di Wenshar, Barbara Hambly, 1993 (novel) 
116 - Il re dei fantasmi, David Gemmell, 1993 (novel) 
117 - Le nebbie di Elundium, Mike Jefferies, 1993 (novel) 
118 - Il Porto dei mondi incrociati, Michael Scott Rohan, 1993 (novel), 
119 - Il destino di Deverry, Katharine Kerr, 1993 (novel). 
120 - La chiamata degli eroi, Paul Edwin Zimmer, 1993 (novel). 
121 - L'ultima spada del potere, David Gemmell, 1993 (novel). 
122 - Krispos di Videssos, Harry Turtledove, 1993 (novel). 
123 - L'assedio di Vorsal, Barbara Hambly, 1994 (novel). 
124 - Il lupo dei Drenai, David Gemmell, 1994 (novel). 
125 - Il libro di Tezin-Dar, Angus Wells, 1994 (novel). 
126 - Verso la spirale dei mondi, Michael Scott Rohan, 1994 (novel). 
127 - Ritorno da Tezin-Dar, Angus Wells, 1994 (novel). 
128 - I cavalieri dei Gabala, David Gemmell, 1994 (novel). 
129 - Il drago di Deverry, Katharine Kerr, 1994 (novel). 
130 - L'impero degli incanti, Michael Scott Rohan, Allan Scott, 1995 (novel). 
131 - Il mago di Tezin-Dar, Angus Wells, 1995 (novel). 
132 - La leggenda di Druss, David Gemmell, 1995 (short story collection). 
133 - Il castello fra i mondi incrociati, Michael Scott Rohan, 1995 (novel). 
134 - Il potere del fuoco, Martha Wells, 1995 (novel). 
135 - Krispos l'imperatore, Harry Turtledove, 1995 (novel). 
136 - Il tempo dell'esilio, Katharine Kerr, 1995 (novel). 
137 - Il libro dei poteri, Harry Turtledove, 1996 (novel). 
138 - La spada delle Highland, David Gemmell, 1996 (novel). 
139 - I difensori di Cylith, Luca Pesaro, 1996 (novel). 
140 - I signori del cielo, Angus Wells, 1996 (novel). 
141 - Juti Manho la guerriera, Carol Severance, 1996 (novel). 
142 - Il cavaliere del Sole Nero, C. S. Friedman, 1996 (novel). 
143 - Il tempo dei presagi, Katharine Kerr, 1996 (novel). 
144 - Aurian, Maggie Furey, 1996 (novel). 
145 - Le pietre del potere, David Gemmell, 1997 (novel). 
146 - I giorni del sangue e del fuoco, Katharine Kerr, 1997 (novel). 
147 - L'Oceano del Sole Nero, C. S. Friedman, 1997 (novel). 
148 - La regina guerriera, David Gemmell, 1997 (novel). 
149 - La pietra di Moor, Morgan Fairy, 1997 (novel). 
150 - L'arciere di Kerry, Lynn Flewelling, 1997 (novel). 
151 - La corona nascosta, C. S. Friedman, 1997 (novel). 
152 - La regina delle Highland, David Gemmell, 1997 (novel). 
153 - Aurian: L'arpa dei venti, Maggie Furey, 1998 (novel). 
154 - Il tempo della giustizia, Katharine Kerr, 1998 (novel). 
155 - Alec di Kerry, Lynn Flewelling, 1998 (novel). 
156 - Amazon, Gianluigi Zuddas, 1998 (novel). 
157 - Aurian: La spada di fuoco, Maggie Furey, 1998 (novel). 
158 - La spada delle rune, Ann Marston, 1998 (novel). 
159 - Aurian: Dhiammara, Maggie Furey, 1999 (novel). 
160 - Le maschere del potere, Errico Passaro, 1999 (novel). 
161 - Il re d'occidente, Ann Marston, 1999 (novel). 
162 - Stella di Gondwana, Gianluigi Zuddas, 1999 (novel). 
163 - La lama infranta, Ann Marston, 1999 (novel). 
164 - Il traditore di Kerry, Lynn Flewelling, 1999 (novel). 
165 - Il principe di Skai, Ann Marston, 1999 (novel). 
166 - Le amazzoni del sud, Gianluigi Zuddas, 2000 (novel). 
167 - Il cuore di Myrial, Maggie Furey, 2000 (novel). 
168 - Il re delle ombre, Ann Marston, 2000 (novel). 
169 - Il libro dell'Impero, Adalberto Cersosimo, 2000 (short story collection). 
170 - Il figlio delle tempeste, Fabiana Redivo, 2000 (novel). 
171 - La spada in esilio, Ann Marston, 2000 (novel). 
172 - La pietra degli elementi, Fabiana Redivo, 2001 (novel). 
173 - Il segno dei ribelli, Rossella Romano, 2001 (novel). 
174 - La trappola d'oro, James Oliver Curwood, 2001 (novel). 
175 - Gli eredi della luce, Mariangela Cerrino, 2001 (short story collection). 
176 - Il seme perduto, Fabiana Redivo, 2001 (novel). 
177 - Il sigillo nero, Morgan Fairy, 2002 (novel). 
178 - Le sette gemme, Andrea D'Angelo, 2002 (novel). 
179 - Solomon Kane il giustiziere, Robert E. Howard, Gianluigi Zuddas, 2002 (short story collection). 
180 - Il respiro delle montagne, Ornella Lepre, 2002 (novel). 
181 - L'arcimago Lork, Andrea D'Angelo, 2002 (novel). 
182 - Il figlio del vento, Fabiana Redivo, 2002 (novel). 
183 - Il settimo figlio, Orson Scott Card, 2002 (novel). 
184 - Il profeta dalla pelle rossa, Orson Scott Card, 2002 (novel). 
185 - Alvin l'apprendista, Orson Scott Card, 2002 (novel). 
186 - La loggia della lince, Katherine Kurtz, Deborah Turner Harris, 2003 (novel). 
187 - Le luci di Avardale, Mary Corran, 2003 (novel). 
188 - Lo spirito della pietra, Maggie Furey, 2003 (novel). 
189 - La fortezza, Andrea D'Angelo, 2003 (novel). 
190 - Le spade incantate, Marion Zimmer Bradley (editor), 2003 (anthology). 
191 - Le nebbie di Afra, Fabiana Redivo, 2003 (novel). 
192 - Il cerchio dei dodici, Katherine Kurtz, Deborah Turner Harris, 2003 (novel). 
193 - Le tre candele, Marion Zimmer Bradley, Elisabeth Waters, 2003 (novel breve) - 
194 - L'occhio dell'eternità, Maggie Furey, 2004 (novel). 
195 - La giustizia delle spade, Marion Zimmer Bradley (editor), 2004 (anthology). 
196 - La spada dei re, Fabiana Redivo, 2004 (novel). 
197 - Il sigillo infranto, Katherine Kurtz, Deborah Turner Harris, 2004 (novel). 
198 - Le libere amazzoni di Darkover, Marion Zimmer Bradley (editor), 2004 (anthology). 
199 - La città di luce e d'ombra, Patricia A. Mc Killip, 2005 (novel). 
200 - La rocca dei silenzi, Andrea D'Angelo, 2005 (novel). 
201 - Streghe Guerriere, Marion Zimmer Bradley (editor), 2005 (anthology). 
202 - Le nevi di Darkover, Marion Zimmer Bradley (editor), 2005 (anthology). 
203 - Con il cuore e con la spada, Marion Zimmer Bradley (editor), 2006 (anthology). 
204 - Le torri di Darkover, Marion Zimmer Bradley (editor), 2006 (anthology). 
205 - La luce della spada, Marion Zimmer Bradley (editor), 2007 (anthology). 
206 - Le donne di Darkover, Marion Zimmer Bradley (editor), 2007 (anthology). 
207 - Nel segno del coraggio, Marion Zimmer Bradley (editor), Rachel E. Holmen (editor), 2008 (anthology). 
208 - La quattro lune di Darkover, Marion Zimmer Bradley (editor), 2008 (anthology).

Notes

 Publication Series: Fantacollana at Internet Speculative Fiction Database
 Fantacollana at fantascienza.com

Fantasy books by series
1973 establishments in Italy
2008 disestablishments in Italy
Publications established in 1973
Publications disestablished in 2008